Guillermo Rein is a professor of fire science in the Department of Mechanical Engineering at Imperial College London. His research is focused on fire, combustion, and heat transfer. He is the editor-in-chief of the journal Fire Technology and Fellow of the Combustion Institute.

Rein is best known for his contributions to smouldering combustion research in the field of fire science.

Biography
Rein obtained his Industrial Engineering degree at the ICAI School of Engineering in 1999. He studied mechanical engineering at the University of California, Berkeley, and obtained an MSc in 2003 and a PhD. in 2005. He taught at the School of Engineering of the University of Edinburgh (2006–2012), where he was a senior lecturer before moving to Imperial College in 2012.

Research 

His research is centred on heat transfer, combustion and fire. He is best known in three areas: polymer and wood ignition; design of fire-resistant structures; and wildfire spread and mitigation.

Rein, together with his research group and collaborators, has edited two books, published six book chapters and over 100 journal publications. His current h-index is 51 and citation count is over 6,900 on Google Scholar.

Rein has been editor-in-chief of the journal Fire Technology since 2012. He was associate editor of Proceedings of the Combustion Institute from 2013 to 2019; associate editor of Thermal and Mass Transport (Frontiers of Mechanical Engineering) from 2016;  and is on the editorial board of Safety Science and the advisory board of International Journal of Wildland Fire since 2016. He was also on the editorial board of Fire Safety Journal from 2014 to 2017.

Selected Awards 
 2009 Hinshelwood Prize
2016 SFPE Lund Award
 2017 The Engineer Collaborate-to-Innovate Prize
 2017 Sugden Award
 2018 Arthur B. Guise Medal
2020 Research Excellence Award

References

External links 
 Imperial Hazelab's webpage

Mechanical engineers
Living people
University of California, Berkeley alumni
Year of birth missing (living people)
Academics of Imperial College London
Combustion engineering
Fellows of The Combustion Institute
Academics of the University of Edinburgh
Fire
Science communicators
21st-century British scientists
21st-century Spanish scientists
21st-century British educators
21st-century British engineers